Angels with Dirty Faces is the third album of English musician Tricky, released in 1998. The title is taken from the film of the same name.

Music and lyrics 
"Broken Homes" features English singer-songwriter PJ Harvey. "Carriage for Two" features the guitar playing of Anthrax guitarist Scott Ian. Various tracks features the guitars of Marc Ribot. "The Moment I Feared" is a cover of the Slick Rick track of the same name.

Critical reception 

In a contemporary review for Entertainment Weekly, David Browne viewed Angels with Dirty Faces as Tricky's best album since his 1995 debut Maxinquaye. He described it as an "alluring sonic blur" that preserved his previous music's mesmeric sounds yet felt "more adventurous, rhythmically and musically, than its predecessors". Simon Price hailed it as Tricky's most cogent work since his debut album: "Simultaneously challenging and gorgeously formed, it's a brilliant mix of defiance and achievement." Village Voice critic Robert Christgau said it was a rock album with a live band on every song, no samples, and "grimy" productions that complemented Tricky's anti-social themes, making for a difficult but interesting listen:

In a retrospective review for AllMusic, Stephen Thomas Erlewine was less enthusiastic about the record. He wrote that while Tricky had expanded his signature dub-inspired trip hop sound with rhythmic elements from hardcore hip hop and jungle music, Angels with Dirty Faces was "slightly different but essentially the same" as his previous album Pre-Millennium Tension.

As of September 2003 it has sold 113,000 copies in United States according to Nielsen SoundScan.

Track listing

Personnel 

 Design, Photography By [manipulation] – AP;D
 Drums – Perry Melius (tracks: 1, 5, 6, 9 to 11)
 Engineer – Ethan Allen (tracks: 2, 6, 8, 10 to 12)
 Engineer [Additional Mixing] – Jack Hersca (tracks: 2 to 4, 6 to 12)
 Assistant engineer – Chipman Verspyck (tracks: 1, 3, 5, 9 to 12), Mark Fraunfelder (tracks: 1, 3, 5, 8 to 10), Serge Tsai
 Guitar – Scott Ian (tracks: 1, 5, 9 to 12)
 Keyboards, Producer, Photography By [Palaroid], Illustration – Tricky
 Mastered By – Howie Weinberg
 Mixed By – Susan Rogers (tracks: 2, 3, 5 to 12), Tricky (tracks: 2 to 12)
 Cover Photography – Barron Claiborne
 Vocals – Martina Topley-Bird (tracks: 3, 5, 6, 8 to 10), Tricky (tracks: 1, 2, 4 to 12)
 Written-By – Tricky (tracks: 1, 2, 4 to 6, 8 to 12)
Pete Briquette - bass
Gareth Bowen - keyboards
Jack Hersca - bass, guitar
Jane Scarpantoni - cello
Gene Lake, Calvin Weston - drums
Lorenza Ponce - violin
Marc Ribot, Patrice Serapiglia - guitar
Doug Wieselman - flute
Greg Cohen - double bass

Charts

Certifications and sales

References

External links 
 

1998 albums
Tricky (musician) albums
Island Records albums